"Local Bus" is a song by the queen of Bangladeshi folk music Momtaz and rapper Shafayat from Jalali Set. The song was composed by Pritom and released under the banner of Gaanchill Music.

Composition
This song was composed by Pritom. He likes to experiment with different genres. Local Bus was a fusion of hip-hop and folk music. It was difficult to mix folk music into hip-hop. This is the first time Momtaz worked in a digital dub step type of song.

Release history
The song was in the development stage for over a year. Then, Gaanchill Music gave it a green light. The song Wwas released with a music video on YouTube on September 2, 2016. It went viral within several hours. After 5 days, it had over half a million views on YouTube.

Reception
This song was well received by almost all music listeners of Bangladesh. This was the first time Momtaz performed alongside a hip-hop artist.

References 

2016 singles
Bengali-language songs
2016 songs
Momtaz Begum songs
Bangladeshi songs